Soğukçam (formerly: Germenos) is a village in the Göynük District, Bolu Province, Turkey. Its population is 26 (2021). The oldest Phrygian script was found in this village.

References

Villages in Göynük District